Wailua Valley State Wayside Park is located 31 miles east of Kahului, Maui. The lookout provides views into Ke'anae Valley. From the park you can view waterfalls, the Ko'olau Gap, Wailua Peninsula and the rim of Haleakala Crater.

See also
 List of Hawaii state parks

References

Protected areas of Maui
State parks of Hawaii